Percale is an unincorporated community in Monroe County, in the U.S. state of Georgia.

History
The community was named for a percale linens factory at the site.

References

Unincorporated communities in Monroe County, Georgia
Unincorporated communities in Georgia (U.S. state)